The Bavarian Class D XI engines were branch line (Lokalbahn) saturated steam locomotives built for service with the Royal Bavarian State Railways (Königlich Bayerische Staatsbahn).

History 
The state railway procured 139 examples between 1895 and 1912; it was the most numerous Bavarian branch line locomotive. Both Krauss and Maffei supplied three prototypes each and both were later involved in the production batches. 

Eight locomotives of the same type were supplied by Krauss in 1900 to the Lokalbahn AG (Lokalbahn Aktien-Gesellschaft or LAG), which later sold them to the Bavarian state railway, where they were given the numbers 2507 to 2512. A further three locomotives were supplied by Krauss to the South German Electric Branch Lines (AG Süddeutsche elektrische Lokalbahnen) that was taken over in 1904 by the LAG; again these locomotives were sold to the state railway. They were given the numbers 2762–2764. These machines were designated as Class PtL 3/4 under the new classification scheme, but did not differ significantly from the newer Class D XI engines. Another five PtL 3/4 were procured by the state railway in 1914 and given the numbers 2783–2787.

Three of these locomotives were also produced for the Palatinate Railway (Pfalzbahn) as the T 4.II, but these had different dimensions, including smaller driving and carrying wheels.

The Deutsche Reichsbahn took over all 147 vehicles in 1925 as the  DRG Class 98.4-5. The D XI engines were given the numbers 98 411–556 and the PtL 3/4 machines the numbers 98 561–568. About half the locomotives were retired between 1931 and 1933.

Two machines remained after the Second World War in Czechoslovakia and four in Austria. The latter were numbers 98 500, 514, 546 und 549, which were given the numbers 791.01–04 by the Austrian Federal Railway (Österreichische Bundesbahn or ÖBB). They were taken out of service in 1957.

The Deutsche Bundesbahn took over 56 engines in 1945. The last loco was taken out of service in 1960 in Nuremberg and transferred to Ingolstadt. There it was set up as a memorial in front of the station in 1968. This sole surviving example of the Bavarian D XI is cared for today by the Apian-Gymnasium at Ingolstadt.

A 1:10 scale model of this locomotive was built between 1962 and 1964 in the training workshops of the Weiden depot (AW Weiden) and is today in the railway museum of Weiden in der Oberpfalz.

Design 
These locomotives were among the first to be fitted with a Krauss-Helmholtz bogie. Some received a counter-pressure brake of the Riggenbach type.

The five PtL 3/4 locomotives differ from the previous ones in having a longer length over buffers of 9,306 mm, a slightly lower indicated power of 310 PSi and a slightly greater coal capacity of 1.8 tons.

LMKO 1 to 11, LAG 62 to 64 
For the construction of the Murnau–Kohlgrub–Oberammergau Local Railway (LMKO), the South German Electric Local Railway Company (Aktien-Gesellschaft Süddeutsche elektrische Lokalbahnen) procured two locomotives from Krauss with serial numbers 3930 and 3931, which were delivered in August 1899. When it was realised that the electrification of the route would not be completed in time for the 1900 Oberammergau Passion Play, further locomotives of the D XI class were procured in two batches (factory numbers 4129 to 4131 and 4260 to 4265). The eleven locomotives were given operating numbers LMKO 1 to 11.

On the bankruptcy of the South German Electric Local Railway Company in October 1901, the Royal Bavarian State Railways took over services between Murnau and Oberammergau. As a result, locomotives LMKO 4 to 11 were taken over by the state railways and given operating numbers 2505 to 2512.

The remaining three locomotives went to Lokalbahn Aktien-Gesellschaft (LAG) in 1904 when they bought the Murnau–Oberammergau line. The LAG gave them operating numbers 62 to 64 and, in addition to their primary line, they were also used on the Murnau–Garmisch-Partenkirchen Localbahn line. On the nationalization of the Murnau–Garmisch-Partenkirchen railway in 1908, these three locomotives also became the property of the Royal Bavarian State Railways and were classified as PtL 3/4 with operating numbers 2762 to 2764.

Overview

Trivium 
After the three locomotives LAG 62 to 64 were transferred to the Royal Bavarian State Railways, their old LAG operating numbers were incorporated into their new ones. For example, no. 62 became no. 2762.

See also 
 Royal Bavarian State Railways
 List of Bavarian locomotives and railbuses

References

Bibliography

Railway locomotives introduced in 1895
0-6-2T locomotives
D 11
Standard gauge locomotives of Germany
Krauss locomotives
Maffei locomotives
C1′ n2t locomotives